John Randall Reding (October 18, 1805 – October 8, 1892) was an American politician who served as a U.S. Representative from New Hampshire.

Early life 
Born in Portsmouth, New Hampshire, Reding attended public schools. He was apprenticed to the printer's trade and subsequently became an newspaper editor.

Career 
Reding was elected as a Democrat to the 27th and 28th United States Congress. After leaving congress, he served as naval storekeeper at Portsmouth from 1853 to 1858, and as mayor of Portsmouth in 1860. He was later a member of the New Hampshire House of Representatives from 1867 to 1870.

Death 
Reding died in Portsmouth on October 8, 1892, and was interred in Haverhill Cemetery in Haverhill, New Hampshire.

References

External links 
 

1805 births
1892 deaths
Democratic Party members of the United States House of Representatives from New Hampshire
Mayors of Portsmouth, New Hampshire
Democratic Party members of the New Hampshire House of Representatives
19th-century American politicians